Miroslav "Miro" Šipek (born 6 April 1948) is an Australian rifle shooting coach. During his long and successful shooting career he was a champion of Yugoslavia 27 times in a range of disciplines (19 times as a senior and 8 as a junior National Team member). He won several medals at various international competitions and Balkans Championships, 4 silver medals at European Championships and a bronze at the 1970 World Championships in Phoenix Arizona.

Miro represented Yugoslavia at the 1976 Summer Olympics in rifle shooting. In 1992, he led the first Bosnia-Herzegovina National Team from his war torn country to the 1992 Summer Olympics. Miro was the coach for Australia's shooters at 2000 Summer Olympics, 2004 Summer Olympics and 2008 Summer Olympics. He was the coach for Australia's Paralympic shooters at the Athens 2004, Beijing 2008,  London 2012 and Rio 2016.

Personal
Born on 6 April 1948 in Sarajevo, Bosnia and Herzegovina (former Yugoslavia) where he attended Primary School, High School and University for Physical Education.

In 1973 he married Mirsada Čengić, club teammate and member of the Bosnian-Herzegovinian shooting team. Together they've had two children (Goran and Mirela) and four grandchildren (Denis, Dino, Aron and Liam).

He started playing sport at a young age and was a talented footballer and table tennis player. His shooting career started in 1965 when he joined ‘Mico Sokolovic’ Shooting Club in his home town of Sarajevo. Very next year, he became member of the most successful Yugoslav club 'Mile Vujocic Uco - Sarajevo'.  He represented Yugoslavia as part of the Junior National Team 15 times, his first appearance being in Bucharest in 1965.

During his long and successful shooting career he was a champion of Yugoslavia 27 times in a range disciplines (19 times as a senior and 8 as a junior National Team member). He won number of medals at various international competitions and Balkans Championships, 4 silver medals at European Championships and a bronze at the World Championships in Phoenix Arizona. He represented Yugoslavia at the 1976 Summer Olympics.

In 1969, he was honoured as the Athlete of the Year of Bosnia and Herzegovina. He was a recipient of various regional and national honours and awards in ex-Yugoslavia, including the 'Silver Rays' ("Orden Zasluga Za Narod sa Srebrnim Zracima") which is the highest civilian decoration awarded by the late Yugoslav president Josip Broz Tito.

In 1985, after more than 250 appearances for Yugoslav Team in competitions and championships all over the world, he retired from competing and continued his shooting career as a Coach and National Selector. In 1986, Miro led Yugoslav Shooting Team to World Championships Title (prone women) in Suhl, Germany.
He worked as a High Performance Manager at the Bosnian-Herzegovinian Institute of Sport. 
In 1992 he led the first Bosnian-Herzegovinian National Team from his war torn country to the 1992 Summer Olympics.

His career continues in Australia where he moved with his family in 1995. He worked with the National Olympic Shooting Team of Australia from 1997 and took the team to the Olympics in 2000 Summer Olympics, 2004 Summer Olympics and 2008 Summer Olympics, as well as the Commonwealth Games in Manchester 2002 and Melbourne 2006. In 2009 he started working with the Australian Paralympic Shooting Team, whom he has been coaching until his retirement in January 2019.

Shooting

Sporting Achievements
 April 1966 broke the Yugoslav national record, 3-positions 3x20 (562)
 April 1966 chosen for the junior National Team of Yugoslavia
 September 1966 debuted with the senior National Team of Yugoslavia
 October 1966 First senior gold medal at the Balkan Championship 3x20 (571) (total of 16 gold medals at Balkan Championships throughout career)
 1968 Silver medal at the Junior European Championships in Wiesbaden (Germany) 
 1969 Silver medal in team 3-positions discipline 3x20 at the European Championships in Plzen (Czechoslovakia)
 1969 named as the athlete of the year of Bosnia and Herzegovina
 1970 recipient of the Plaque of the City of Sarajevo
 1970 Team bronze medal at the World Championships in Phoenix Arizona (60 Prone)
 1975 placed 5th, 3-positions, at the World Championships in Thun (Switzerland) 
 1975 awarded 'Silver Rays' Decoration by the late Yugoslav president Josip Broz Tito
 1975 Silver medal at the European Championships in Bucharest (Romania)
 1976 competed at the 1976 Summer Olympics where he represented Yugoslavia in the Three Position, Prone 50 meter events
 1966-1985 Several Sport Honours – Yugoslavia
 1981 Youth Day (May 25) Award 
 Awarded the title of the Meritorious Athlete of Yugoslavia
 1989 ISSF (UIT) Gold Medal Honour 
 1988-1992 President of National Shooting Association B&H
 1992-1996 Member of Executive Committee – Olympic Committee B&H
 1992 Led the first B&H National Team to the 1992 Summer Olympics
 1995 first non German to win Gau-Schützenkönig (Shooting King) in Ruhpolding, Germany

Coaching
Miro Sipek is a rifle shooting coach. He led Yugoslav Shooting Team to World Championships Title (prone women) in 1986, Suhl (Germany).

From 1997 Miro has been coaching Australian Shooting Team(s). Shooters he has coached include Warren Potent, Ashley Adams,
 Libby Kosmala, Jason Maroney, Tim Lowndes, Sue McCready, Belinda Imgrund (Muhlberg), Carrie Quigley, Sam and Rob Wieland, Nat Smith, Luke Cain, Anton Zappelli, Bradley Mark... He started coaching Ben Burge in 2003.

Miro was the coach for Australia's shooters at the Summer Olympic Games in:
 2000
 2004
 2008.

He coached Australia's Paralympic shooters at the Paralympics in: 
 Athens 2004
 Beijing 2008 and Paralympics.
 London 2012
 Rio 2016.

Miro was also shooting coach for Commonwealth Games in:
  Manchester 2002
  Melbourne 2006

Retirement
After a 54-year career in shooting, first as an athlete and then as a coach, Miro finally retired for the sport in January 2019.

References

Living people
1948 births
Shooters at the 1976 Summer Olympics
Sportspeople from Sarajevo
People from Melbourne
Australian Olympic coaches
Coaches at the 2004 Summer Paralympics
Coaches at the 2008 Summer Paralympics
Coaches at the 2012 Summer Paralympics
Coaches at the 2016 Summer Paralympics
Olympic shooters of Yugoslavia
Yugoslav male sport shooters
Bosnia and Herzegovina male sport shooters
Paralympic coaches of Australia
Bosnia and Herzegovina emigrants to Australia